Renato Chua (born February 15, 1950) better known as Rhene Imperial, a former action star, former producer and currently born-again Christian minister in the Philippines.

Career
Imperial starred in Boy Singkit (1980) with Tony Ferrer and Carmen Ronda, Tong (1980) with Ace Vergel, Deathrow (1981) with Rudy Fernandez and Anthony Alonzo, Quintin Bilibid (1981) with Tetchie Agbayani, Ka Freddie (1984) Gintong Araw ni Boy Madrigal (1984), Miguel Cordero (1985), Sigue-Sigue Brothers (1985) with Bembol Roco and Efren Reyes, Jr. and Ulo ng Gang-Ho (1985) with Dante Varona, Anthony Alonzo and Rey Malonzo.

He became the line producer in Basagan ng Mukha (2001) starring Manny Pacquiao.

Personal life
He was married to actress Carmen Ronda, and they had four children. After years of being together they decided to separate. Veteran actress Carmen Ronda died from ovarian cancer in 2010.

Imperial has two children to Janet Jamora (twin sister of Jinkee Jamora-Pacquiao).

In March 1988, Task Force Anti-Gambling (TFAG) chief Potenciano Roque accused Imperial along with 37 others of being illegal gambling operators. In 1990, numerous illegal gambling operators in Davao City pointed to Imperial as the head of the largest gambling operation in the area, with the NBI charging him with estafa and illegal gambling.

He is currently converted as a born-again Christian minister.

Filmography
Alas Tres ng Hapon... Lumuhod ang Maton (1977)
Sa Iyo ang Araw... Sa Akin ang Gabi (1978)
Mga Paru-parong Ligaw (1978)
Boy Singkit (1980)
Maneng Tirador (1980)
Tong (1980)
Boy Nazareno (1981)
Shoot the Killer (1981)
Death Row (1981)
Quintin Bilibid (1981)
K-9 Hunts Takas (1981)
Ninong (1982)
Misyon: Dakpin si Bogart (1982)
Pepeng Hapon (1983)
Sgt. Maximo Velayo: Trigger ng Mga Kumander (1983)
13 Hudas (1983)
Ka Freddie (1984)Gintong Araw ni... Boy Madrigal (1984)Tatak Munti (1985)Bala Ko ang Hahatol (1985)Sigue-Sigue Brothers (1985)Miguel Cordero (1985)Ulo ng Gang-Ho (1985)Calapan Jailbreak (1985)Boy Tipos (1985)Kahit Sa Bala, Hindi Kami Susuko (1986)Pepe Saclao: Public Enemy No. 1 (1986)Walang Ititirang Buhay (1986)Amang Hustler (1987)Mahal Kita... Kahit Sino Ka Pa! (2001)Basagan ng Mukha'' (2001)

References

External links
Rhene Imperial at video48 blogspot

1950 births
Living people
20th-century Filipino male actors
Filipino Christian religious leaders
Filipino Christians
Filipino male film actors
Filipino Methodists